Josey is an abbreviated form of the given name Joseph. Notable people with the name include:

Josey Little
Josey Scott, American rock musician, singer-songwriter, and record producer
Josey Wales (born 1956), Jamaican dancehall DJ

Fictional characters:
Josey Wales (character)